Lovestruck is a 2005 Philippine romantic comedy film directed by Louie Ignacio. The film stars Jolina Magdangal, Jennylyn Mercado, Mark Herras and Mike Tan.

Cast
 Jolina Magdangal as Jandra 
 Jennylyn Mercado as Denise
 Mark Herras as Joel
 Mike Tan as Jason 
 Rainier Castillo as Cholo
 Yasmien Kurdi as Jojo
 Ryza Cenon as Myka
 CJ Muere as Cocoy
 LJ Reyes as Sophia
 Kirby de Jesus as Lloyd
 Lorna Tolentino as Mom of Cocoy and Myka
 Gina Alajar as Amalia
 Keempee de Leon as Chico
 Allan K. as Allan
 Julio Diaz as Banjo

Awards

References

External links

GMA Pictures Profile

2005 films
GMA Pictures films
Filipino-language films
Philippine romantic comedy films